Medfield State Hospital, originally the Medfield Insane Asylum, is a historic former psychiatric hospital complex at 45 Hospital Road in Medfield, Massachusetts, United States.  The asylum was established in 1892 as the state's first facility for dealing with chronic mental patients.  The college-like campus was designed by William Pitt Wentworth and developed between 1896 and 1914. After an era dominated by asylums built using the Kirkbride Plan, Medfield Insane Asylum was the first asylum built using the new Cottage Plan layout, where instead of holding patients in cells, they would be integrated into a small community and work a specific job.  It was formally renamed "Medfield State Hospital" in 1914.

It raised its own livestock and produce, and generated its own heat, light and power. Added to the National Register of Historic Places in 1994, the property was closed in April 2003 and the buildings shuttered. The grounds have been restored, and reopened to the public and are open every day from sun up to sundown. It has been used as a filming location for thriller/horror motion pictures such as The New Mutants, Shutter Island, and The Box. As of July 2012, The Clark Building was demolished. Local Medfield Police now patrol the facility. Trespassing is strictly forbidden past dark and until sunrise. Within the grounds of the hospital lies the Medfield State Hospital Cemetery which has 841 gravesites. This cemetery was opened from 1918 until 1988. Originally, only numbers were on the graves in this cemetery until a Boy Scout from Troop 89 made it his Eagle Scout service project to find the names and dates of death of all those buried in the cemetery.

Starting in October 2013 demolition of three buildings was completed; The Odyssey House, the Carriage House, and the Laundry Building.

See also
National Register of Historic Places listings in Norfolk County, Massachusetts

References

External links 

 . (Various documents).
 History, vintage photos, and pictures of modern decay
 Town of Medfield page about the hospital, including reuse plans
 Asylumprojects.org homepage for Medfield State Hospital
 Photos of Medfield State Hospital

Hospital buildings completed in 1892
Historic districts in Norfolk County, Massachusetts
Psychiatric hospitals in Massachusetts
Defunct hospitals in Massachusetts
Medfield, Massachusetts
National Register of Historic Places in Norfolk County, Massachusetts
Historic districts on the National Register of Historic Places in Massachusetts